Marvodol is a village in Nevestino Municipality, Kyustendil Province, south-western Bulgaria.

Honours
Marvodol Glacier on Fallières Coast, Antarctica is named after the village.

References

Villages in Kyustendil Province